Simon John Godsill (born 2 December 1965) is professor of statistical signal processing at the University of Cambridge, and a professorial fellow at Corpus Christi College. He is also a member of the Centre for Science and Policy. His main area of research is Bayesian statistics and stochastic sampling methodologies, particularly particle filtering.

Education

Godsill obtained both undergraduate and Ph.D. degrees from the Department of Engineering at Cambridge University, whilst a member of Selwyn College. He obtained a first class degree in the Electrical and Information Sciences Tripos. The title of his 1993 Ph.D. thesis was "The Restoration of Degraded Audio Signals" and his Ph.D. supervisor was Peter Rayner, whom he shared with Michael Richard Lynch.

Career

Godsill has published over 250 articles in peer reviewed journals, along with the books Digital audio restoration : a statistical model based approach and Compressed sensing & sparse filtering.

Business interests
Godsill is currently a director of CEDAR Audio Ltd, a Cambridge-based company that applies Bayesian mathematics for purposes of noise reduction in audio data. In February 2005, the company received a Sci-Tech Academy Award (a 'Technical Oscar') for its services to the movie industry, and a stream of innovations appeared over the following years with corresponding recognition including induction into the Audio Technology Hall of Fame (2008), a Cinema Audio Society Award (2009). Godsill is also a director at Input Dynamics Ltd, a Cambridge-based company that applies Bayesian techniques to touch screen technology. Godsill is involved with the research effort at BMLL Technologies, a Cambridge spin-off working in the field of machine learning on the limit order book.

References

1961 births
Living people
British statisticians
Engineering professors at the University of Cambridge
Alumni of Sidney Sussex College, Cambridge